José Luis Cordero – also known as Pocholo – is a Mexican actor, singer and director. He was born in Mexico City on February 13, 1948, as a son of the composer Víctor Cordero Aurrecoechea (died in 1983). Luis Christian Cordero Oñate – son of José Luis – died in 2004.

Filmography

Films 
 Un tigre en la cama (2009)
 La fórmula de Rasputín (2001)
 Vamos al baile (1996)
 Me tengo que casar/Papá soltero (1995) — Pocholo
 Mecánica mexicana (1995)
 Los cargadores (1995) 
 A ritmo de salsa (1994) 
 La cantina (1994) 
 Le pegaron al gordo (1994) 
 Suerte en la vida (1994) 
 Encuentro sangriento (1994)
 Soy hombre y qué (1993) 
 Yo no la maté (1993) 
 Mi novia ya no es Virginia (1993) 
 Cambiando el destino (1992) 
 ¿Cómo fui a enamorarme de ti? (1991) 
 El bizcocho del Panadero (1991) 
 Secreto sangriento (1991) — Sergio 
 Domingo trágico (1991) 
 La noche del fugitivo (1991) 
 La última fuga (1991) 
 No tan virgen (1991) 
 La verdadera historia de Barman y Droguin (1991) 
 Retén (1991) 
 Entre la fe y la muerte (1990) 
 El camaleón (1990) 
 El día de las locas (1990) 
 Ruleta mortal (1990) — Luis
 Fugas del capitán fantasma (1989) 
 La mafia tiembla II (1989)

 No le saques, pos no le metas (1989) 
 Al filo de la muerte (1989) 
 Te gustan, te las traspaso (1989) 
 Chiquita... No te la acabas (1989) 
 El Francotirador fenómeno (1989) 
 Destrampados in Los Angeles (1987)
 Cursilerías (1986) 
 Quiéreme con música (1957)

Telenovelas 
Dos hogares — Mario
Al diablo con los guapos — Horacio
La fea más bella — Paco Muñoz
Contra viento y marea — Pocholo
Velo de novia — Gumaro
¡Vivan los niños! — Patotas
Por tu amor

See also 
Joaquín Cordero — an uncle of José Luis

References 

1948 births
Living people
Mexican male telenovela actors